Mike, Lu & Og is an animated television series created by Mikhail Shindel, Mikhail Aldashin, and Charles Swenson for Cartoon Network, and the 7th of the network's Cartoon Cartoons. The series follows a foreign exchange student from Manhattan named Mike, a self-appointed island princess named Lu, and a boy-genius named Og. The trio take part in various adventures as Mike and the island's natives share their customs with each other.

Before its cancellation, fifty-two eleven-minute episodes were produced by Mikhail Shindel's Kinofilm Animation in Los Angeles and animated by Mikhail Aldashin at Studio Pilot in Russia, featuring two stories per episode. The series features voice actors Nika Futterman as Mike, Nancy Cartwright as Lu, and Dee Bradley Baker as Og. The distinctive animation style is similar to shows produced by Klasky Csupo, such as Rugrats, Duckman, Aaahh!!! Real Monsters, The Wild Thornberrys, Rocket Power, and As Told by Ginger, due to its crudely drawn look.

Reruns were broadcast on Boomerang from 2006 to 2011. On November 6, 2017, the series was added to Cartoon Network on Demand. as well as on HBO Max in Latin America.

Premise
Mike applies as a foreign exchange student and asks to be sent to a tropical island (which briefly sinks and pops back up like a cork every few hundred years or so). She finds herself dumped on a forgotten, scantily mapped island populated by descendants of a British shipwreck. This island is called Albonquetine Island, named after one of their founders, Joshua Wendell Albonquetine. It may be based on the real-life Pitcairn Islands. The castaways have "gone native" and try to behave like Polynesians, with varying degrees of success.

Characters
  (short for Michelanne) (voiced by Nika Futterman) - Mike is an 11-year-old Manhattan-born girl who enjoys the features of the tropical island, but misses the life she had in New York and, as revealed in a particular instance, her school. Fortunately, Og is able to recreate many of the things that Mike misses most about the United States, at one instance creating a television.
  (voiced by Nancy Cartwright) - Lu is a 10-year-old self-proclaimed princess of the island, Og's cousin and Alfred and Margery's niece is characterized by her loud and arrogant nature. She continually exploits Mike, Og, and her pet turtle, Lancelot. Og, being sagacious to a fault, frequently obliges to her will, even at the cost of her own well-being. Though she has a habit of tormenting everyone, she usually learns a lesson in humility by the end of each episode. Lu's unruly behavior is most likely a result of poor parenting on the part of her father, Wendell.
 Lancelot Turtle - Lancelot is Lu's long-suffering pet land turtle. She dresses him up in gaudy outfits, forces him to perform weird and dangerous stunts, and often makes him carry Lu on her back. For this reason, Lancelot is always running away from Lu, which is why she keeps him on a leash. Despite this abuse, Lancelot tends to be the savior of Mike and the Islanders (especially Lu) when they're in trouble. Like the other animals on the island, Lancelot tends to exercise more common sense than the humans. Unlike the members of the Philosophical Society, he does not speak (except for a "squeaky" type scream when Lancelot's in danger or a snickering laugh and in "Night of the Living Relatives" where he shouted "BOO" to scare the daylights out of Lu).
  (voiced by Dee Bradley Baker) - Og is a 7-year-old member of the Albonquetines, Lu's cousin and Wendell's nephew, has a predisposition to scientific theory and discovery. His inventions gone awry help develop the plots of many episodes. He is close friends with his three pets, which are a pig named Mrs. Pig (voiced by Kath Soucie), a goat named Mr. Goat (also voiced by Dee Bradley Baker), and a porcupine named Spiney Porcupine (voiced by Martin Rayner) who are capable of speech and well learned in philosophy. Together, they form the Philosophical Society, discussing such "great thinkers" as Nietzsche, matters of existentialism, and the relevance of time. Og enjoys experiencing new things. To name a few adventures, Og made a video game for himself in "A Boy's Game" which he got hooked on during a flood, performed nude in a fashion show in "Hot Couture" (possibly a homage to "The Emperor's New Clothes"), and made jujubombs in an episode of the same name.
  (voiced by S. Scott Bullock) - Wendell is Lu's father and Alfred's brother, and the Governor of the Island. Wendell is Og's uncle and Margery's brohter-in-law. He is wiry, weak-willed (as seen when he ate so many sweets that he returned into his former, "pre-workout" shape in the course of a few hours), and is seemingly unable to control his daughter or of delivering any sort of punishment to her. He is then apt to start crying. He has been the island's Governor for many years. This was misinterpreted by Mike, who thought he was an American-esque governor, which led to an "election" on the island, not realising that the Islanders came to the island from England (and, as seen in the episode with "King Bob", they hold the "King of England" in great respect). He has a large collection of tea cosies, and speaks in a squeaky falsetto similar in style to Kenneth Williams, although whether this was intentional or not remains uncertain. His wife is never seen or mentioned.
  (voiced by Martin Rayner) - Alfred is Og's father and Wendell's brother, and Margery's husband. Alfred is Lu's uncle. He is eccentric and charismatic, and also has a noticeable speech impediment preventing him from pronouncing his Rs. He fancies himself to be the island's hunter, using suction-cup arrows to persistently hunt a wombat named Woolly Wombat. It appears that the island's inhabitants are vegetarian (though clams and chicken soup appear to be fair game), so one may wonder what happens if Alfred ever catches Woolly (including Alfred himself). It was also revealed in "The Great Snipe Hunt" that Alfred is oblivious for the fact that Og does not want to go hunting with him.
  (voiced by Kath Soucie) - Margery is Og's mother and Alfred's wife, who fancies herself to be an artist and writer. Margery's is Wendell's sister-in-law and Lu's aunt. Her arts including painting, sculpting, and cooking. The majority of Margery's artwork has to do with the island's ancestors. For this, she often seen working on a sculpture of several ancestors on the side of a mountain, reminiscent of Mount Rushmore. Every once in a while she will also be found painting food, and often found cooking it. Margery is the island's chef, preparing meals and tea for everyone on her side of the island, as well as preparing buffets and elaborate meals for special occasions. In writing, she is something of a historian. Throughout the series she is working on a book about the island's history titled "Cuzzlewits End". Margery is very level-headed compared to Alfred's eccentric behavior. An example of this is shown in "Scuba Dooby Doo" when Alfred valiantly offers to protect everyone from the mailman whereas Margery plans on serving tea and crumpets.
  (voiced by Corey Burton) - Old Queeks is the island elder and witch doctor whom the Islanders seek advice from. He is also seen to be able to perform a kind of magic, summoning dead spirits. He is often opposed to Mike's innovative ways, but sometimes gets caught up in the modern crazes to hit the island. Old Queeks claims to be psychic and he claims to "know all and see all". In one episode, Mike becomes suspicious of Queeks and decides to investigate him. She climbed up the opposite side of the mountain and found that Old Queeks was not psychic but that he spied on the Islanders through a telescope. Even after Mike informed the Islanders about Old Queeks' telescope, they still held onto their beliefs that he was psychic and communicated with a higher power(s). In some respects, this is truth enough. He can see all with a telescope, and he did bring ghosts to the island to plague Mike for annoying him. He lives alone on the top of a mountain in a cave, and enjoys using "bat products" (i.e.: products made with bat guano). This includes everything from toothpaste to snacks.
 Pirates - Three pirates living nearby are descended from the pirates who caused the Brits to be shipwrecked in the first place, but were then shipwrecked themselves. Their leader is named Captain (voiced by Brian George) with two wooden legs and two eye patches. Despite these handicaps, he seems to get around without any problems. The other two pirates are called First Mate (voiced by Martin Rayner) and Bos'n (voiced by Corey Burton). The pirates sometimes attempt to catch and eat Lancelot, but are always foiled by the three children. In one episode, Mike invited the pirates to a Thanksgiving type feast but with only one catch, that the three Pirates had to dress up as Mike's (girl)friends visiting from Manhattan without causing concern with the others (with the exception of Lancelot who saw through their disguises). The pirate captain is known to force his men to put on blindfolds, so he can sneak into his treasury and put a rabbit puppet named Bunny on his hand, engaging in conversations with it, speaking for it in a squeaky voice. In its first appearance, the rabbit puppet's mouth moved as the captain spoke. In its following appearance, the mouth stayed still.
 The Cuzzlewits - The Cuzzlewits are the other inhabitants of the island (whose very existence Lu eagerly denies), live on the other side of the island. Although they are shown to live in caves, one of their number, Hermione (voiced by Alison Larkin), a Cuzzlewit girl, is seen to be an extremely experienced thinker. She is accompanied by two Cuzzlewit boys, twin brothers Haggis and Baggis (voiced by Brian George and S. Scott Bullock), who constantly batter each other with clubs and appear to be dimwitted and rowdy. In the only episode taking place on the Cuzzlewits' side of the island, "Queeks, Queeks Who Got the Queeks?", they are revealed to have a much larger population than the Albonquetanians. The elders of the Cuzzlewits and the Albonquetanians do not get along, hence their separation. This leads to a practical question: what do the Cuzzlewits call the island? Despite the adults' squabbles, Mike and Hermione become friends in "The Three Amigas". The Cuzzlewits are shown to all have the same genetic characteristics – an underbite which causes their lower central incisors to be bucked teeth.

Production
Mike, Lu & Og premiered on Cartoon Network's animation shorts showcase World Premiere Toons as a seven-minute short on November 6, 1998. In January 1999, Cartoon Network announced that three new original series would premiere on the network: Courage the Cowardly Dog, I Am Weasel, and Mike, Lu & Og. Mike, Lu & Og was set to premiere in November of that year with 13 episodes. According to Animation World Magazine, the series premiere date was set for November 12, 1999, and would be produced simultaneously at Pilot Studio in Moscow and Kinofilm in Los Angeles. The series ran on Cartoon Network from November 12, 1999, to May 27, 2001, airing 26 half-hour episodes in total. A video game deal between Cartoon Network and Majesco Entertainment featuring characters from the series  was announced for the Nintendo Game Boy Advance handheld console in May 2002.

Series overview

Episode list

This is a list of episodes from the animated series Mike, Lu & Og.  The show ran for two seasons consisting of 13 episodes, each with two 11-minute segments.

Pilot

Season 1 (1999–2000)

Season 2 (2001)

References

External links

  (archive)
 Kinofilm Studios
   (archive)
 

1990s American animated television series
2000s American animated television series
1999 American television series debuts
2001 American television series endings
American children's animated adventure television series
American children's animated comedy television series
Fictional trios
1999 Russian television series debuts
2001 Russian television series endings
Russian children's animated adventure television series
Russian children's animated comedy television series
Animated television series about children
Cartoon Network original programming
Television shows set on islands
English-language television shows
Cartoon Cartoons